Mustapha Khalif (born 10 October 1964) is a Moroccan footballer. He played in 21 matches for the Morocco national football team from 1993 to 1998. He was also named in Morocco's squad for the 1998 African Cup of Nations tournament.

References

External links
 

1964 births
Living people
Moroccan footballers
Footballers from Casablanca
Morocco international footballers
1998 African Cup of Nations players
Association football midfielders